Gagarin is a large lunar impact crater that is located in the southern hemisphere on the far side of the Moon. To the southwest is the crater Pavlov and to the northeast lies Keeler. Closer to the rim are the craters Levi-Civita to the southwest, and Beijerinck to the north-northeast. Isaev lies entirely within the northwest rim of Gagarin. In contrast with the floor of Gagarin, Isaev has a floor with a somewhat low albedo.

Physical characteristics

The crater is named for Yuri Gagarin, the cosmonaut who was the first human in space and the first to orbit the Earth. The six craters falling within the perimeter of Gagarin have also been named after pioneers of Russian aviation and astronautics, including Isaev, Grave, Balandin, Raspletin, Kosberg, and Andronov.

Gagarin has been heavily eroded by a long history of crater impacts. The worn rim forms a low, circular ridge around the somewhat bowl-shaped interior. The inner floor is covered by a multitude of crater impacts of various dimensions. Little if anything remains of a central ridge, if the crater ever possessed such a feature.

Satellite craters 
By convention these features are identified on lunar maps by placing the letter on the side of the crater midpoint that is closest to Gagarin.

See also 
 1772 Gagarin, asteroid

References

Bibliography

External links
Lunar Topographic Orthophotomaps:
 Northwest Gagarin: LTO-102B2, Isaev
 Northeast Gagarin: LTO-103A1, Grave
 Southwest Gagarin: LTO-102B3, Andronov
 Southeast Gagarin: LTO-103A4, Raspletin

Impact craters on the Moon
Monuments and memorials to Yuri Gagarin